{{Infobox song
| name       = Graffiti on the Train
| cover      = Stereophonics - Graffiti on the Train single (cover).png
| alt        = An artwork created by Steve Goddard of a skeleton which was featured in Graffiti on the Trains album booklet.
| type       = single
| artist     = Stereophonics
| album      = Graffiti on the Train
| released   =  (UK)
| recorded   = 2012-2013
| studio     =
| venue      =
| genre      = Alternative rock
| length     =  (album) (radio edit)
| label      = Stylus Records, Ignition Records
| writer     = Kelly Jones
| producer   = 
| prev_title = Indian Summer
| prev_year  = 2013
| next_title = We Share the Same Sun
| next_year  = 2013
| misc       = 
}}

"Graffiti on the Train'''" is a song by rock band Stereophonics. It is the second track on their 2013 studio album of the same name and was released as the third single from the album on 13 May 2013.

Background and release
Writing for "Graffiti on the Train" started when lead singer Kelly Jones thought children were trying to break into his house. When he caught them one time they explained to him they were trying to get to the railway behind his house in order to spray graffiti on a train. The idea that they were trying to spray a proposal message on one of the trains stuck with Jones and subsequently appeared in the song's lyrics.

Formats
Promotional singles were made available which featured the song as well as the radio edit and the instrumental version and was released on 22 April 2013. The limited 10" vinyl edition with lyrics etched on Side B was available to pre-order on the band's website and was released on 13 May 2013.

The cover art for "Graffiti on the Train" was designed by Steve Goddard. The artwork was featured in Graffiti on the Train's album booklet.

Release history

Music video
The music video for "Graffiti on the Train" was directed by Jones and was shot at the Empress Ballroom in Blackpool. It features Stereophonics performing and is the first music video from Graffiti on the Train to only feature the band as the previous videos featured various other people. During the verses, handwriting of the lyrics appear as Jones sings them.

Live performances
"Graffiti on the Train" made its live debut at Electric Brixton, London. Stereophonics held a March tour to support Graffiti on the Train'' and the title song was played at every venue. It has become a regular in their set list since its debut.
During the band's summer festival run, they played "Graffiti on the Train" at these festivals, including Pinkpop Festival, T in the Park and the V Festival. The song was one of the 6 songs from the album played at Radio 2 In Concert.

Track listings

Personnel

Stereophonics
 Kelly Jones – lead vocals, guitar
 Richard Jones – bass guitar
 Adam Zindani – guitar, backing vocals
 Javier Weyler – drums

Additional
 Jim Lowe – keyboards, programming

Technical
 Production – Kelly Jones, Jime Lowe
 Mixing – Jones, Lowe
 Engineering – Lowe
 Mastering – Dick Beetham

Charts

References
Notes

Footnotes

2013 singles
Stereophonics songs
Songs written by Kelly Jones
2013 songs